A special election for Texas's 27th congressional district was held on June 30, 2018, following the resignation of Rep. Blake Farenthold. Republican Michael Cloud won with about 54.7% of the vote, crossing the 50% threshold needed to avoid a runoff. Running again against Eric Holguin in the general election, he won a full term.

Background
The district is reliably Republican; President Donald Trump carried it by a more-than-20-point margin in 2016.

Rep. Blake Farenthold resigned on April 6, 2018 due to allegations of sexual harassment, therefore a special election was needed in order to fill this seat until the 2018 midterms. Consequently on April 23, 2018, Texas Attorney General Ken Paxton approved of Governor Greg Abbott's plan to call a special election.

Michael Cloud won this election, and got to serve the remainder of Farenthold's term in the 115th Congress, until January 2019. He previously won the Republican runoff for the same seat, so he appeared on the November ballot where he went on to win the general election.

Candidates

Republican Party

Declared
Michael Cloud, former Victoria County Republican Party chairman
Marty Perez

Withdrawn
Bech Bruun

Democratic Party

Declared
Raul (Roy) Barrera
Eric Holguin, former congressional staffer
Mike Westergren

Libertarian Party

Declared
Daniel Tinus

Independents

Declared
Judith Cutright
Christopher Suprun

Endorsements

Notes

Results

References

External links
Official campaign websites
Raul "Roy" Barrera (D) for Congress
Michael Cloud (R) for Congress
Eric Holguin (D) for Congress
Dr. Marty Perez (R) for Congress
Chris Suprun (I) for Congress
Daniel Tinus (L) for Congress

Texas 2018 27
Texas 2018 27
2018 27 Special
Texas 27 Special
United States House of Representatives 27 Special
United States House of Representatives 2018 27
June 2018 events in the United States